John F. Kennedy High School is a public school located in Mt. Angel, Oregon, United States, as part of the Mt. Angel School District.  The school was originally Mt. Angel Preparatory School run by the Benedictine monks of Mount Angel Abbey, and was founded in 1887.  The Benedicitnes ran the school until 1964, when they turned its administration over to St. Mary's Catholic Church, located in Mt. Angel.  The parish ran the school for five years until closing it in 1969.  It was reopened one year later as John F. Kennedy High School, and remains so today.

Student profile 

As of the 2014–15 school year, there were 180 students enrolled at John F. Kennedy High School. Kennedy's ethnic makeup is 58% Hispanic, 38% Caucasian, and 5% other.

Academics
In 2014, 79% of the school's seniors received a high school diploma.  Kennedy currently offers five Advanced Placement (AP) courses. The school also began the AVID program at the beginning of the 2015–16 school year.

Clubs
Kennedy's clubs include:
 FBLA
 Habitat for Humanity
 HOSA
 National Honor Society
 Unidos Para Siempre (UPS)
 Future Farmers of America (FFA)

Athletics 
The school mascot is the Trojan.  Kennedy competes in baseball, softball, football, basketball, wrestling, swimming, cross-country, volleyball, track and field, golf, and band.  Kennedy is classified as a 2A OSAA team, and is a member of the Tri-River Conference.

The Trojans have won state championships in baseball (2012), girls' track (1985, 2014), girls' basketball (2016, 2018, 2020), girls softball (2018), football (2018), and volleyball (2019).  In addition, Kennedy teams have won numerous league championships and placed very highly at the state competition level.

References

External links
 John F. Kennedy High School

Mt. Angel, Oregon
High schools in Marion County, Oregon
Public high schools in Oregon
Educational institutions established in 1970
1970 establishments in Oregon